Miguel Arcangel Pourier (29 September 1938 – 23 March 2013) served as Prime Minister of the Netherlands Antilles three times. He first served from 6 July 1979 to December 1979; he next served from 31 March 1994 to 14 May 1998 and he last served from 8 November 1999 to 3 June 2002. He belonged to the Bonaire Patriotic Union (UPB) and Party for the Restructured Antilles (PAR). He was born in Rincon, Bonaire.

From 1973 he served as Minister for Development Cooperation in the cabinet of Juancho Evertsz and later served as Minister for Finance and Economic Affairs.

References

1938 births
2013 deaths
Government ministers of the Netherlands Antilles
Party for the Restructured Antilles politicians
Prime Ministers of the Netherlands Antilles